The 2012–13 West Virginia Mountaineers men's basketball team represented West Virginia University during the 2012–13 NCAA Division I men's basketball season. The Mountaineers were led by sixth year head coach Bob Huggins and played their home games at WVU Coliseum. This was the Mountaineers first season as members of the Big 12 Conference. They finished the season 13–19, 6–12 in Big 12 play to finish in eighth place. They lost in the first round of the Big 12 tournament to Texas Tech.

Before the Season

Departures

Recruits

Elijah Macon has committed to West Virginia, but he is doing a Post-Graduate year at Brewster Academy and won't join the Mountaineers until the 2013-14 season.

Roster

Schedule

|-
!colspan=12 style="background:#FFCC00; color:#003366;"| Exhibition

|-
!colspan=12 style="background:#003366; color:#FFCC00;"| Regular season

|-
!colspan=12 style="background:#FFCC00; color:#003366;"| 2013 Big 12 men's basketball tournament

References

West Virginia Mountaineers men's basketball seasons
West Virginia
Mount
Mount